The Hindavi Swarajya ("self-rule of Hindu people", meaning independence from foreign rule) is a term attributed to Shivaji, the founder of the Maratha Empire. After Shivaji's death, the term swarajya came into widespread use, without "Hindavi" but rather associated with "Maratha". According to André Wink, the term "Maratha swarajya" meant a form of zamindari sovereignty, not necessarily attached to any particular territory. During the reign of Shivaji, The Koli Caste made a substantial contribution to the success of the Swarajya movement.

The term Swaraj was later adopted by Bal Gangadhar Tilak, one of the early leaders of the Indian independence movement against the British Empire.

Origin 
Popular belief holds that the Maratha warrior Shivaji used the phrase Hindavi Swarajya in a letter to Dadaji Naras Prabhu Deshpande of Rohidkhore on 17 April 1645. The purported letter, in Marathi, states:

Scholars do not agree on the authenticity of the letter. Historian Setumadhavarao Pagadi states that a lot of the historical source material on Shivaji is spurious, contributed by various influential families of Maharashtra to show how close their ancestors were to Shivaji. J. V. Naik states that, irrespective of the authenticity of the letter, Shivaji's career itself amply demonstrates his conception of Swarajya.

The term Hindavi (or Hindawi, as also Hindui and Hindi) has been in use since the 14th century with the meaning of "Indian". Poet Amir Khusro listed various "Hindavi languages" in use in his time. These were distinguished from Persian, the court language in most Muslim states. Historian Irfan Habib states that, the term "Hindu" had acquired a religious sense by this time, and so, other terms such as Hindi, Hindustani and Hindavi began to be employed to mean "Indian", spanning all Indian people. According to Pagadi, Hindavi had the sense of "the sons of the soil" in this context.

Swarajya (IAST: svarājya) is a Sanskrit term, whose meaning is "independent dominion or sovereignty" according to the Monier Williams dictionary. Pagadi notes that Shivaji had referred to his jagir in Pune as a rajya. He takes Swarajya to have meant a "homeland", and Hindavi Swarajya a "state of the sons of the soil".

References

Bibliography
 
 
 
 
 
 
 

Indian independence movement
Maratha Empire
Wars of independence